Storm over Asia (Potomok Chingiskhana, "The Heir to Genghis Khan") is a 1928 Soviet propaganda film directed by Vsevolod Pudovkin, written by Osip Brik and Ivan Novokshonov, and starring Valéry Inkijinoff. It is the final film in Pudovkin's "revolutionary trilogy", alongside Mother (1926) and The End of St. Petersburg (1927).

Plot 
In 1918 a young and simple Mongol herdsman and trapper is cheated out of a valuable fox fur by a European capitalist fur trader. Ostracized from the trading post, he escapes to the hills after brawling with the trader who cheated him. In 1920 he becomes a Soviet partisan, and helps the partisans fight for the Soviets against the occupying British army. However he is captured by the British when they try to requisition cattle from the herdsmen at the same time as the commandant meets with a reincarnated Grand Lama. After the trapper is shot, the army discovers an amulet that suggests he is a direct descendant of Genghis Khan. They find him still alive, so the army restores his health and plans to use him as the head of a puppet regime. The trapper is thus thrust into prominence as he is placed in charge of the puppet government. By the end, however, the "puppet" turns against his masters in an outburst of fury.

Historical Portrayal 

The British were never in Mongolia, whereas the Soviet Union was heavily active spreading political influence by discrediting the unstable Bogd Khanate, whilst working towards the establishment of a Mongolian Soviet puppet state. However, given the variety of clues to the fictionalized narrative of the film (e.g. the military decorations that seem to resemble the German Empire juxtaposed together with the flag of the Union Jack), it's improbable that the film was ever received as a documentary. According to Slavicist John MacKay, it seems "the studio was trying to make a kind of all-purpose anti-imperialist, pro-Soviet film, transferable to many locales, rather than an analysis of a specific setting." As to some historical accuracy, Anti-Bolshevik monarchist troops led by rogue "mad baron" Roman von Ungern-Sternberg did invade Mongolia in October 1920, vying for territorial control with the Chinese.

Unlike such films as October 1917 or Battleship Potemkin, which are about revolutions in European Russia, Storm over Asia concerns itself with a distorted, fictionalised British occupation of Southeastern Siberia and Northern Tibet. The British and the French had supported Russia on a massive scale with war materials during World War I. After the Treaty of Brest-Litovsk, it looked as though much of that material would fall into the hands of the Germans. Under this pretext, Allied intervention in the Russian Civil War began, with the United Kingdom and France sending troops into Russian ports. There were violent confrontations with troops loyal to the Bolsheviks.

While film plot was heavily fictional, some film footage, such as Cham dance, was filmed during an actual ceremony at Tamchinsky datsan.

Cast
Valéry Inkijinoff — Bair, the Mongol [The Son - U.S.] (as Valeri Inkishanov)
I. Dedintsev — The British Commandant
Aleksandr Chistyakov — The Russian Rebel Leader
Viktor Tsoppi — Henry Hughes, unscrupulous fur-buyer.
F. Ivanov — The Lama
V. Pro — British missionary, translates amulet
Boris Barnet — British soldier, pipe smoker
Karl Gurniak — British soldier
I. Inkizhinov — Bair's Father
L. Belinskaya — The Commandant's Wife
Anel Sudakevich — Commandant's blonde daughter

External links and References

1928 films
Films directed by Vsevolod Pudovkin
Soviet war drama films
Soviet revolutionary propaganda films
1920s war drama films
Films set in the 1910s
Films set in the 1920s
Soviet black-and-white films
Soviet silent feature films
Articles containing video clips
1928 drama films
1920s Russian-language films
Silent war drama films